Anna Grzesiak (born 30 January 1987), is a Polish professional elite triathlete from Kalisz.

In 2008, aged 21, Anna Grzesiak started to take part in ITU triathlons and directly entered the elite category. She placed seventh in her very first (elite) race: the European Cup in Chania. In the same year at the Duathlon European Championships in Greece, i.e. her only non elite competition, Anna Grzesiak won the bronze medal.

In 2008, she placed third in the Polish Championships (U23), and in 2009 she placed fourth (U23).

In Kalisz, her hometown, Anna had attended a vocational sports school  and represented the local club SST Delfin Kalisz.

Now she studies physiotherapy at the Akademia Wychowania Fizycznego im. Eugeniusza Piaseckiego w Poznaniu, in Poznań, and represents the AZS AWF Katowice club.

ITU Competitions 
The following list is based upon the official ITU rankings and the Athlete's Profile Page.

Unless indicated otherwise the following competitions are Olympic Distance Triathlons and refer to the Elite category.

BG = the sponsor British Gas · DNF = did not finish · DNS = did not start

External links 

 Anna Grzesiak's ITU Profile Page
 Polish Triathlon Federation in Polish

Notes 

1987 births
Living people
Polish female triathletes
Sportspeople from Kalisz
21st-century Polish women